Edward Saeger House is a historic home located at Saegertown, Crawford County, Pennsylvania.  It was built about 1845, and is a large, two-story squarish clapboard clad frame dwelling on a stone foundation in the Greek Revival style.  The front facade features a pedimented gable with a distinctive lunette window and second story verandah.  An addition was built about 1866.

It was added to the National Register of Historic Places in 1980.

References

External links
 Edward Saeger House, Saegertown, Crawford County, PA: 1 photo at Historic American Buildings Survey

Historic American Buildings Survey in Pennsylvania
Houses on the National Register of Historic Places in Pennsylvania
Greek Revival houses in Pennsylvania
Houses completed in 1836
Houses in Crawford County, Pennsylvania
National Register of Historic Places in Crawford County, Pennsylvania